Theodoros Sakellaropoulos (unknown – unknown) was a Greek chess player.

Biography
In the 1950s Theodoros Sakellaropoulos was a one of leading Greek chess player. He played mainly in domestic chess tournaments and Greek Chess Championships.

Theodoros Sakellaropoulos played for Greece in the Chess Olympiads:
 In 1952, at first reserve board in the 10th Chess Olympiad in Helsinki (+1, =3, -3),
 In 1958, at fourth board in the 13th Chess Olympiad in Munich (+3, =3, -9).

References

External links

Theodoros Sakellaropoulos chess games at 365chess.com

Greek chess players
Chess Olympiad competitors
1923 births
1997 deaths
20th-century Greek people